1955 in professional wrestling describes the year's events in the world of professional wrestling.

List of notable promotions 
Only one promotion held notable shows in 1955.

Calendar of notable shows

Championship changes

EMLL

NWA

Debuts
Debut date uncertain:
Billy Robinson
Boris Malenko
“Cowboy” Bob Ellis
Curtis Iaukea
Estrella Blanca
The Spoiler
Sweet Daddy Siki
March 27  Chabela Romero
July 1  Butcher Vachon
October 10  Emile Dupre
October 12  Gene LeBell

Births
February 8  Jim Neidhart(died in 2018) 
February 10  Chris Adams(died in 2001) 
February 18  Raymond Rougeau
February 24  Pierre Lefebvre(died in 1985)
February 28  The Commandant
March 1  Mike Tenay
March 12  Terry Taylor
March 19  Rick McGraw(died in 1985) 
April 30  José Luis Feliciano
May 14  Vader(died in 2018) 
May 30  Jake Roberts
June 1  David Schultz
June 4  Precious
June 16  Drew McDonald(died in 2015) 
June 19  Tod Gordon
June 21  Jay Youngblood(died in 1985) 
July 9  Herb Abrams (died in 1996) 
July 18  Iron Mike Steele (died in 2007) 
July 26  Rocky Santana 
August 11  Norio Honaga
September 8  Jerry Balisok (died in 2013) 
September 9  Winona Littleheart (died in 2020) 
September 15  Al Greene(died in 2013) 
September 20  Johnny Kidd
September 29  Mile Zrno
October 8  Judy Martin
October 10  Cachorro Mendoza
November 12  Hubert Gallant
November 17  Ted Allen (died in 2010) 
December 16  Eddy Steinblock (died in 2017) 
December 29  Pantera Sureña
December  Spike Huber

Deaths
September 5  George Tragos (59)
October 12  Bernarr Macfadden (87)
December 17  Jack O'Brien

References

 
professional wrestling